Helen Tanger (born 22 August 1978 in Hardenberg) is a rower from the Netherlands.

Early life and education
Tanger is a graduate of Syracuse University in New York, earning her degree in 2001.

Athletic career
Tanger took part in the World Championships of 2003 in Milan winning the silver medal in the four. With the Dutch eights she qualified for the 2004 Summer Olympics in Athens and she and her team mates rowed to the bronze medal. They won another bronze medal at the 2005 World Championships in Gifu. A short trip to the double sculls in 2005 left her at the fifth position at the 2006 World Championships in Eton.

In 2008, she returned to the eights and she qualified for the 2008 Summer Olympics in Beijing forming a team with Femke Dekker, Annemiek de Haan, Roline Repelaer van Driel, Nienke Kingma, Sarah Siegelaar, Marlies Smulders, Annemarieke van Rumpt and cox Ester Workel.

References

1978 births
Living people
Dutch female rowers
Rowers at the 2004 Summer Olympics
Rowers at the 2008 Summer Olympics
Olympic rowers of the Netherlands
Olympic bronze medalists for the Netherlands
Olympic silver medalists for the Netherlands
Olympic medalists in rowing
People from Hardenberg
Medalists at the 2008 Summer Olympics
Medalists at the 2004 Summer Olympics
20th-century Dutch women
21st-century Dutch women
Sportspeople from Overijssel
Syracuse Orange rowers